Medical education in Thailand was pioneered by King Chulalongkorn, who founded the country's first medical school called the "School of Medical Practitioners" at Siriraj Hospital in 1889, now the Faculty of Medicine Siriraj Hospital, Mahidol University. There are now 23 institutions offering medical programs nationwide, most of them public. All medical schools in Thailand award a Doctor of Medicine (MD) degree, whereby the degree is equivalent to a master's degree in Thailand. Most of these schools also provide postgraduate and specialist programs. The Medical Council of Thailand is responsible for verifying all curricula.

Public 
Faculty of Medicine, Burapha University
Faculty of Medicine, Chiang Mai University
Faculty of Medicine, Chulalongkorn University
Faculty of Medicine and Public Health, HRH Princess Chulabhorn College of Medical Science, Chulabhorn Royal Academy (PC)
Faculty of Medicine, Kasetsart University
Faculty of Medicine, Khon Kaen University
Faculty of Medicine, King Mongkut's Institute of Technology Ladkrabang
School of Medicine, Mae Fah Luang University
Faculty of Medicine, Mahasarakham University
Mahidol University
 Faculty of Medicine Siriraj Hospital (SI)
 Faculty of Medicine Ramathibodi Hospital (RA)
 Collaborative Project to Increase Production of Rural Doctor, Mahidol University (MOPH-Mahidol CPIRD/PI) (affiliated program)
 Maharat Nakhon Ratchasima Hospital
 Sawanpracharak Hospital
 Maharaj Nakhon Si Thammarat Hospital
 Ratchaburi Hospital
 Phramongkutklao College of Medicine (PCM)
Faculty of Medicine, Naresuan University
Faculty of Medicine Vajira Hospital, Navamindradhiraj University (BM)
Vajira Hospital
Taksin Hospital
School of Medicine, University of Phayao
Faculty of Medicine, Prince of Songkla University
Faculty of Medicine, Princess of Naradhiwas University
Srinakharinwirot University
Faculty of Medicine, Srinakharinwirot University
Joint Medical Programme Srinakharinwirot University and the University of Nottingham
Institute of Medicine, Suranaree University of Technology
Thammasat University
Faculty of Medicine, Thammasat University
Chulabhorn International College of Medicine (CICM), Thammasat University
College of Medicine and Public Health, Ubon Ratchathani University
School of Medicine, Walailak University

Private 

College of Medicine, Rangsit University
Lerdsin Hospital
Nopparat Rajathanee Hospital
Rajavithi Hospital
School of Medicine, Siam University
Faculty of Medicine, Bangkokthonburi University
Faculty of Medicine, Western University

References

See also
 Health in Thailand

Thailand

Medical schools
Medical